P. crassidens may refer to:
 Panthera crassidens, an extinct leopard species that lived during the late Pliocene and early Pleistocene in Africa
 Plesiotylosaurus crassidens, a mosasaur species from the Maastrichtian stage of the Late Cretaceous of North America
 Pseudorca crassidens, the false killer whale, an oceanic dolphin cetacean species

See also
 Crassidens